Riegelwood is an unincorporated community and census-designated place (CDP) which sprawls across three counties: Brunswick County, North Carolina; Pender County, North Carolina; Columbus County, North Carolina, United States. As of the 2010 census it had a population of 579. It is the location of a saw mill and a paper mill.

History
The Black Rock Plantation House was listed on the National Register of Historic Places in 2014.

Geography
Riegelwood is located near the eastern tip of Columbus County, south of Mitchell Landing on the Cape Fear River, site of an International Paper plant. North Carolina Highway 87 passes through Riegelwood, leading southeast  to U.S. Routes 74 and 76 in Delco and northwest  to Elizabethtown.

Demographics

Severe weather event in 2006

On November 16, 2006, at 6:21 am EST, a severe thunderstorm warning was issued for eastern Columbus County. At 6:29 am, a tornado warning was issued for the same area. At 6:37, an F3 tornado struck a mobile home park and killed eight people, including two children, Danny Jacobs, 6, and Miguel Martinez, 13. Twenty people were injured. The tornado was a part of a 3-day tornado outbreak in the south in which four other deaths were reported. Riegelwood was one of the hardest hit areas.

On Friday, November 17, 2006, a NOAA National Weather Service storm survey team assessed the tornado damage and rated it at F3 on the Fujita scale for nearly a mile in Riegelwood, with winds approaching . The maximum width of the tornado was 300 yards where the F3 damage occurred. The rest of the  damage path was less than 100 yards wide and rated at F1, with winds less than 100 mph extending north across Columbus County into western Pender County.

The Columbus County sheriff reported thirty homes destroyed in the F3 damage area, and another three structures were damaged in Pender County just west of Currie.

References

Unincorporated communities in Columbus County, North Carolina
Unincorporated communities in North Carolina
Census-designated places in Columbus County, North Carolina
Census-designated places in North Carolina